Lee Paterson (born 5 July 1981) is a former Scotland international rugby league footballer who played in the 2000s and 2010s.

Background
Paterson was born in York, Yorkshire, England.

Playing career
Paterson played with his home town team York City Knights, winning the 2005 National League Two with them, before moving to Batley in 2007. He had stints at Featherstone Rovers and Mackay Cutters in Australia before rejoining York City in 2014.

International honours
Paterson won caps for Scotland while at the Batley Bulldogs, and the Widnes Vikings.

Paterson was named in the Scotland squad for the 2008 Rugby League World Cup.

References

External links
Widnes Vikings profile
Scotland profile
RLWC08 profile
Record Defeat In Perpignan For Bravehearts
Scotland - Strength and Conditioning profile

1981 births
Living people
Batley Bulldogs players
English rugby league players
Keighley Cougars players
RC Carpentras XIII players
Rochdale Hornets players
Rugby league centres
Rugby league five-eighths
Rugby league locks
Rugby league players from York
Rugby league utility players
Rugby league wingers
Scotland national rugby league team players
Whitehaven R.L.F.C. players
Widnes Vikings players
York City Knights players